Suddenly, Tammy! is the self-titled debut album by Suddenly, Tammy! It was released in 1993 via spinART Records.

The album sold around 14,000 copies the first year of its release, making it a success for spinART.

Production
The album was recorded at the band's Cat Box studio, in Lancaster, Pennsylvania.

Critical reception
Trouser Press wrote: "The overly polite indie-label debut sidesteps the likely Carole King comparisons, mostly because the delicate melodies aren’t memorable enough and Beth Sorrentino hasn’t got that strong or distinctive a voice. (She is, however, a skillful pianist.)" The Washington Post wrote that the album "does have moments that are hopelessly coy, but such lively tracks as 'Lamp' and 'Ryan' give Sorrentino's dreaming a kick inside." The New York Times opined that the band "echoes the odd-angled melodies and enigmatic lyrics of Throwing Muses, the smoky voice of 10,000 Maniacs' Natalie Merchant, and the rolling arpeggios and choppy chords of Tori Amos; it also has the calm, determined eccentricity of those performers."

Track listing
"Stacey's Trip"
"Plant Me"
"The Way Up"
"Intro To Babee" [Hidden Track]
"Babee"
"No Respect Girl"
"Can't Decide"
"Disease"
"Lamp"
"Intro To How He" [Hidden Track]
"How He"
"Instrumental"
"Fearless"
"Ryan"
"Mt. Rushmore"

References

1993 albums
Suddenly, Tammy! albums